"This Woman Needs" is a song written by Kristyn Osborn, Bonnie Baker and Connie Harrington, and recorded by American country music group SHeDAISY.  It was released in August 1999 as the second single from their debut album The Whole SHeBANG.  The song peaked at number 9 on the Billboard Hot Country Singles & Tracks chart in March 2000. It also reached number 18 on the RPM Country Tracks chart in Canada.

Chart performance
"This Woman Needs" debuted at number 70 on the U.S. Billboard Hot Country Singles & Tracks for the week of September 4, 1999.

Year-end charts

References

1999 singles
1999 songs
SHeDAISY songs
Song recordings produced by Dann Huff
Lyric Street Records singles
Songs written by Connie Harrington
Songs written by Kristyn Osborn
Songs written by Bonnie Baker (songwriter)